Juan Martín de Pueyrredón is a department of the province of San Luis, Argentina. Its headtown is the city of San Luis, which is also the largest and capital city of the province of San Luis.

With an area of  it borders to the north with Belgrano Department, to the east with Coronel Pringles, to the south with Gobernador Dupuy, and to the west with Mendoza Province.

Until 2010, as per Law #V-0106-2004 (5490) its name was La Capital Department but according to law #V-0748-2010, the name has been changed to Juan Martín de Pueyrredón.

Municipalities 
 Alto Pelado
 Alto Pencoso
 Balde
 Beazley
 Cazador
 Chosmes
 El Volcán
 Jarilla
 Juana Koslay
 La Punta
 Mosmota
 Potrero de los Funes
 Salinas del Bebedero
 San Gerónimo
 San Luis
 Zanjitas

Villages 
 Alto Blanco
 Buena Vista
 Charlone
 Colonia Santa Virginia
 Donado
 Donovan
 El Lechuza
 El Portezuelo
 El Recuerdo
 Las Barrancas
 Gorgonta
 Huejeda
 La Irene
 La Seña
 La Soledad
 Las Gamas
 Los Puquios
 Mataco
 Paso de las Vacas
 Pescadores
 Pozo del Carril
 Punta del Cerro
 San Martín del Alto Negro
 Santa Rosa
 Suyuque Nuevo
 Suyuque Viejo
 Varela
 Villa Pascua

References

External links
 ciudaddesanluis.gov.ar 
 periodistasenlared
 reflejoreal
 la gaceta digital
 sanluis24
 Crónica de San Luis
 Diario de la República

Departments of San Luis Province